Breakbeat hardcore (also referred to as hardcore rave, oldskool hardcore or simply hardcore) is a music genre that spawned from the UK rave scene during the early 1990s. It combines four-on-the-floor rhythms with breakbeats usually sampled from hip hop. In addition to the inclusion of breakbeats, the genre also features shuffled drum machine patterns, hoover, and other noises originating from new beat, sounds from acid house and bleep techno, and often upbeat house piano riffs and vocals.

History

Early 1990s: origins 

The rave scene expanded rapidly in the very early 1990s, both at clubs up and down the country including Labrynth, Shelley's Laserdome, The Eclipse, and Sanctuary Music Arena, and large raves in Warehouses and in the open air attracting 20–50,000 whether put on legally from promoters such as Fantazia and Raindance, or unlicensed by free party sound systems such as Spiral Tribe. Breakbeat hardcore drew its melting pot of sound from a vast array of influences – from new beat and Belgian techno that had for a short period been prominent in the UK rave scene, to house and acid house, and furthermore drawing on hip hop and reggae culture. Amongst the influences from within the rave scene itself upon which this strain of hardcore drew were such acts as Manix, The Hypnotist, CJ Bolland with his "Ravesignal" series, and T99. The huge increase in producers was also driven by the increasing availability of cheap home computer-based studio setups, particularly Cubase for the Atari ST.

Mid-1990s: fragmentation 
By late 1992, breakbeat hardcore started to fragment into a number of subsequent genres: darkcore (piano rolls giving way to dark-themed samples and stabs), hardcore jungle (where reggae basslines and samples became prominent), and happy hardcore (retaining piano rolls and more uplifting vocals).

2000s: revival 
In the 2000s, the style experienced a revival as part of the nu-rave scene.

Hardcore breaks is a style of breakbeat hardcore that appeared in early-to-mid 2000s as part of growing nu-rave scene. The style is inspired by the sound and characteristics of old school breakbeat, while being fused with modern production techniques that distinguish the genre from the classic hardcore breakbeat sound. The music is composed of looped, edited and processed breakbeat samples, intense bassline sounds, melodic piano lines, staccato synthesizer riffs, and various vocal samples (mostly taken from old house records). The speed of this genre typically fell between the range of 145–155 bpm, while the speed may variate on live sets. Originally being produced by a small group of artists with the vision of carrying on where oldskool hardcore left off before the jungle and happy hardcore split using new production techniques and technology, its appeal has now expanded to include artists from the original breakbeat hardcore scene creating new productions.more By the late 2000s, hardcore breaks tend to be produced and played at a bit faster tempos, often between 160–180 bpm. Therefore, it is often played at UK hardcore, freeform hardcore and drum and bass events.

Notable releases
Notable releases include:

 "A Trip to Trumpton" – Urban Hype (Faze 2, 1992)                                                                     
 "Baptised by Dub" – The Criminal Minds (White House, 1992)
 "Be Free" / "Breakage #4" - Noise Factory (Ibiza, 1992)
 "Charly" / "Everybody in the Place" – The Prodigy (XL Recordings, 1992)
 "Close Your Eyes" / "Trip II the Moon" – Acen (Production House Records, 1992)
 "Cookin Up Yah Brain" – 4hero (Reinforced Records, 1992)
 "Dancehall Dangerous" - Hackney Hardcore (Strictly Underground, 1992)
 "DJ's Take Control" / "On a Ragga Tip" – SL2 (XL Recordings, 1992)
 "Far Out" – Sonz of a Loop Da Loop Era (Suburban Base, 1991)
 "Frequency" / "Infiltrate 202" – Altern-8 (Network Records, 1991)
 "Help Me" – Sly T & Ollie J (Blackmarket, 1992)
 "Homicide" / "Exorcist" / "Frequency" – Shades of Rhythm (ZTT Records, 1991)
 "Hurt You So" – Jonny L (Yoyo, 1992)
 "I Feel Love" – Messiah (Kickin Records, 1992)
 "Let Me Be Your Fantasy" – Baby D (Production House, 1992)
 "Loves Got to Be Free" - Noise Factory (XL Recordings/Ibiza, 1992)
 "Mohamed's Mind" - 2 Kilos (Radioactive Lamb, 1990)
 "Music Takes You" - Blame (Moving Shadow, 1991)
 "NHS (Disco Remix)" – Doc Scott (Absolute 2, 1992)
 "Sesame's Treet" – Smart E's (Suburban Base/Atlantic, 1992)
 "Some Justice" – Urban Shakedown (Urban Shakedown, 1992)
 "Spliffhead" / "Hooligan 69" – Ragga Twins (SUAD Records, 1991)
 "Sweet Harmony" – Liquid (XL Recordings, 1992)
 "Teach Me to Fly" - DJ Trace & LTJ Bukem (Out of Orbit, 1992)
 "The Bouncer" – Kicks Like a Mule (Tribal Base, 1992)
 "The Green Man" / "Raving I'm Raving" – Shut Up and Dance (SUAD Records, 1992)
 "The Wickedest Sound" – Rebel MC (Desire, 1991)
 "Waremouse" / "Bombscare" – 2 Bad Mice (Moving Shadow, 1992)
 "We Are I.E." – Lennie De Ice (Reel 2 Reel, 1991)

See also
 Darkcore
 Jungle
 Happy hardcore

References

Citations

Sources

Further reading
 Simon Reynolds, Energy Flash: a Journey Through Rave Music and Dance Culture, Faber and Faber 2013

 
Rave
20th-century music genres
Breakbeat genres
Hardcore music genres
English styles of music
1990s in music